South Africa competed at the 2011 World Aquatics Championships in Shanghai, China between July 16 and 31, 2011.

Medalists

Open water swimming

Men

Women

Mixed

Swimming

South Africa qualified 23 swimmers.

Men

Women

Synchronised swimming

South Africa has qualified 12 athletes in synchronised swimming.

Women

Reserve
Fatima Isaacs

Water polo

Men

Team Roster 

Grant Duane Belcher
Pat McCarthy
Jared Wingate Pearse
Wesley Bohata – Captain
Bevan Manson
Jason Ray Kyte
Gavin John Kyte
Ryan Mckay Bell
Gareth Seth Samuel
Donn Stewart
Adam Kajee
Nicholas Jon Molyneux
Matthew Andrew Chris Kemp

Group D

Classification 13–16

Fifteenth place game

Women

Team Roster

Leigh Maarschalk
Kimberly Patricia Schmidt
Kimberly Kay
Shelley Kirsty Faulmann
Megan Catherine Schooling
Laura Marie Barrett
Christine Joan Barretto
Lee Anne Keet
Delaine Monique Christian
Sarah Lee Harris
Nicolette Poulos – Captain
Kelsey White
Jemma Dendy Young

Group D

Classification 13–16

Fifteenth place game

References

Nations at the 2011 World Aquatics Championships
2011
World Aquatics Championships